Gonatista jaiba is a species of praying mantis living in Hispaniola that was first described in 2004.

See also
List of mantis genera and species

References

Mantidae
Insects described in 2004